House Cleaning Blues is a 1937 Fleischer Studios animated short film starring Betty Boop, and featuring Grampy.

Synopsis
Betty wakes up in the morning after her birthday party.  The house is a shamble, and Betty is not looking forward to cleaning up.  She sings the title song while struggling with her chores.  Grampy shows up to take Betty out for a drive, but Betty can't leave until everything is tidy.

Grampy literally puts on his thinking cap (a mortarboard with a lightbulb on top), and invents a host of labor-saving devices: a cuckoo clock powered dishwasher, a combination bicycle and floor scrubber, and a player piano that folds laundry.  In no time at all, the dancing inventor has the house spic and span, just in time to take Betty for a spin in his automobile (which features a built-in soda fountain).

Notes
 This is the first episode in which Betty doesn't have a separated layer of her hair shown.

References

External links
 House Cleaning Blues on Youtube.
 
 

1937 films
Betty Boop cartoons
1930s American animated films
American black-and-white films
1937 animated films
Paramount Pictures short films
Fleischer Studios short films
Short films directed by Dave Fleischer